George Hodges (1856–1919) was an American  Episcopal theologian, born at Rome, New York, and educated at Hamilton College (A.B., 1877; A.M., 1882; LL.D., 1912). He served at Calvary Church, Pittsburgh, Pennsylvania, from 1881 to 1894. In 1893 he helped establish the Kingsley Association in Pittsburgh, an organization dedicated to helping immigrant workers. Afterward, he became the dean of the Episcopal Theological School at Cambridge, Massachusetts.  "The high esteem in which his religious messages are held by the reading public" resulted in a number of his books being reissued as a second edition in 1914.

Bibliography 
 1892: The Episcopal Church : its doctrine, its ministry, its discipline, its worship, and its sacraments. New York : Thomas Wittaker.
 1892: Christianity between Sundays. New York : T. Whittaker.
 1894: The Heresy of Cain.  New York : Thomas Whittaker. 
 1895: Massachusetts churchmanship : a paper read at a meeting of the Clerical Association in Boston, October twenty-eighth, MDCCCXCV.  Cambridge : s.n.
 1896: Faith and social service; eight lectures delivered before the Lowell Institute. New York : T. Whittaker. (1900, 1915)
 1899: The Battles of Peace. New York : Thomas Whittaker. (1914)
 1901: William Penn. Boston/New York : Houghton Mifflin and Co. (1929)
 1904: Fountains Abbey : the Story of a Mediæval monastery. London : J. Murray.
 1904: When the King came; stories from the four Gospels. Boston/New York : Houghton, Mifflin and Co.
 1904:  Organized labor and capital; the William L. Bull lectures for the year 1904 , with Washington Gladden, Talcott Williams, and Francis Greenwood Peabody
 1904: The Human Nature of the Saints. New York : T. Whittaker. (1905, 1914)
 1906: Three Hundred Years of the Episcopal Church in America. Philadelphia : Published for the Missionary Thank Offering Committee by G.W. Jacobs.
 1906 (with John Reichert): The administration of an institutional church : a detailed account of the operation of St. George's parish in the city of New York. New York/London : Harper & Bros.
 1906: The Year of Grace (two volumes, 1906; second edition, 1914)  
 1909: The apprenticeship of Washington, and other sketches of significant colonial personages. New York : Moffat, Yard & Co.
 1911: The Training of Children in Religion. New York : Appleton. (1912, 1914, 1917, 1919, 1923)
 1911: Everyman's Religion. New York : The Macmillan Company (1913)
 1912: Saints and heroes since the Middle Ages. New York : H. Holt
 1913: Classbook of Old Testament History. New York : The Macmillan Co. (1914, 1915, 1917, 1918, 1923, 1925, 1932, 1937)

References

External links

 
 
 

American non-fiction writers
American Episcopal theologians
American Episcopal priests
1856 births
1919 deaths
Hamilton College (New York) alumni
People from Rome, New York
19th-century American Episcopalians